Following the 2013 election, Gert Jørgensen from the Conservatives had become mayor of Sorø Municipality.
In 2017 he would win re-election, despite the party failing to become the largest.

In the election, the Conservatives would gain a seat, becoming just as large as the Social Democrats. Following the election results, Anne Madsen from the Social Democrats looked set to take the mayor's position away from the Conservatives, as an agreement was reached between the Social Democrats, the Green Left, Danish People's Party
and the Red–Green Alliance.
However some timer later, dramatically Lars Schmidt from Danish People's Party decided to switch party affiliation to Conservatives, and Gert Jørgensen would now have majority behind him.

Electoral system
For elections to Danish municipalities, a number varying from 9 to 31 are chosen to be elected to the municipal council. The seats are then allocated using the D'Hondt method and a closed list proportional representation.
Sorø Municipality had 21 seats in 2021

Unlike in Danish General Elections, in elections to municipal councils, electoral alliances are allowed.

Electoral alliances  

Electoral Alliance 1

Electoral Alliance 2

Electoral Alliance 3

Results

Notes

References 

Sorø